ʿAbd Allāh ibn ʿAbbās (c. 619 – 687 CE), also known as Ibn ʿAbbās, was one of the cousins of the Islamic prophet Muhammad.  He is considered to be the greatest mufassir of the Qur'an.

He was the son of Abbas ibn Abd al-Muttalib, an uncle of Muhammad, and a nephew of Maymunah bint al-Harith, who later became Muhammad's wife. During the early struggles for the caliphate he supported Ali, and was made governor of Basra. He withdrew to Mecca shortly afterwards. During the reign of Mu'awiya I he lived in Hejaz and often travelled to Damascus. After Mu'awiya I died in 680 CE he fled to at-Ta'if, where he died in around 687 CE.

'Abd Allah ibn Abbas was highly regarded for his knowledge of traditions and his critical interpretation of the Qur'an. From early on, he gathered information from other companions of Muhammad and gave classes and wrote commentaries.

Biography

Family
He was the third son of a wealthy merchant, ‘Abbas ibn ‘Abd al-Muttalib, thus he was called Ibn Abbas (the son of Abbas). His mother was Umm al-Fadl Lubaba, who prided herself in being the second woman who converted to Islam, on the same day as her close friend Khadijah bint Khuwaylid, Muhammad's wife.

The father of Ibn Abbas and the father of Muhammad were both sons of Shaiba ibn Hashim, better known as ‘Abdu’l-Muṭṭalib. Shaiba bin Hashim's father was Hashim ibn Abd Manaf, the progenitor of the Banu Hashim clan of the Quraish tribe in Mecca.

619–632: Muhammad's era
Ibn Abbas was born in 3 BH (619–620 CE) and his mother took him to Muhammad before he had begun to suckle.  This event represented the beginning of a close relationship between them.

As he grew up, he was by Muhammad's side doing different services like fetching water for ablution. He would pray with Muhammad and follow him on his assemblies, journeys and expeditions. It is said that Muhammad would often draw him close, pat him on the shoulder and pray, "O God! Teach him (the knowledge of) the Book (Qur'an) ". Muhammad had also supplicated for him to attain discernment in religion. Ibn Abbas kept following Muhammad, memorizing and learning his teaching.

Muhammad's statement

In , Muhammad fell into his last illness. During this period, the Hadith of the pen and paper was reported, with Ibn Abbas as the first-level narrator, at that time about twelve years old. Days after that, Abbas and Ali supported Muhammad's weight on their shoulder, as Muhammad was too weak to walk unaided.

632–634: Abu Bakr's era

Inheritance from Muhammad 

Ibn 'Abbas was thirteen years old when Muhammad died. After Abu Bakr came to power, Ibn Abbas and his father were among those who unsuccessfully requested part of Muhammad's inheritance.  Abu Bakr said that he had heard Muhammad say that prophets do not leave inheritance behind as a divine rule.

Continued education
After Muhammad's era, he continued to collect and learn Muhammad's teaching from Muhammad's companions, especially those who knew him the longest. He would consult multiple Sahaba to confirm narrations, and would go to as many as thirty Companions to verify a single matter. Once he heard that a Sahaba knew a hadith unknown to him.

In addition to his own scholarship, Ibn Abbas was a teacher. His house from where he taught became the equivalent of a university.

One of his companions described a typical scene in front of his house:

He held classes on one single subject each day. His classes covered topics such as tafsir, fiqh, Halal and Haraam, ghazawa, poetry, Arab history before Islam, inheritance laws, Arabic language and etymology.

634–644: Umar's era

Advising Umar
Umar often sought the advice of Ibn Abbas on important matters of state and described him as a "young man of maturity":

The Sahaba Sa`d ibn Abi Waqqas said:

656–661: Ali's era

Battle of Siffin

Ibn Abbas remained a staunch supporter of the fourth Caliph Ali ibn Abi Talib, during Ali's war with Muawiyah, including at the Battle of Siffin. He had also been given the position of governor of Basra during Ali's reign as Caliph.

A large group of Ali's army were discontented with the outcome of Ali's war with Muawiyah, and broke off into a separate group that became known as the Khawarij or Kharijites. Ibn Abbas played a key role in convincing a large number of them to return to Ali; 20,000 of 24,000 according to some sources. He did so using his knowledge of Muhammad's biography, in particular, the events of the Treaty of Hudaybiyyah.

680–683: Yazid's era
Sunnis believe that ibn Abbas was in favour of the unity of the Muslims and hence did not revolt against rulers. He advised Husayn ibn Ali against his proposed expedition to Kufa that ended at Karbala.

Wives and children
By a Yemenite princess named Zahra bint Mishrah, Ibn Abbas had seven children.

 Al-Abbas, the first born, who was childless.
 Ali ibn Abdullah (died 736), who was the grandfather of the first two Abbasid caliphs, who replaced the Umayyads in 750.
 Muhammad, who was childless.
 Ubaydullah, who was childless.
 Al-Fadl, who was childless. (Riverine Sudanese trace their ancestry to al-Fadl through a son named Saeed, whose mother is said to be from the Ansar).
 Saad had two children
 Lubaba, who married Ali ibn Abdullah ibn Jaafar and had descendants.

He had another daughter, Asma, by a concubine; she married her cousin Abdullah ibn Ubaydullah ibn Abbas and had two sons.

Hadith transmitted by him
Ibn Abbas narrated that Muhammad said, "Two favours are treated unjustly by most people: health and free time."  (from Sahih Bukhari, at-Tirmidhi, ibn Majah and al-Nasa'i)

Ibn Abbas reported: Muhammad said, "He who does not memorize any part from the Qur'an, he is like the ruined house." (from Tirmidhi)

On the authority of Ibn Abbas, who said, "One day I was behind (i.e. riding behind him on the same mount) the Prophet and he said to me: 'Young man, I shall teach you some words (of advice).  Be mindful of Allah, and Allah will protect you.  Be mindful of Allah, and you will find Him in front of you.  If you ask, ask of Allah; if you seek help, seek help of Allah.  Know that if the nation were to gather together to benefit you with anything, it would benefit you only with something that Allah had already prescribed for you, and if they gather together to harm you with anything, they would harm you only with something Allah had already prescribed for you.  The pens have been lifted and the pages have dried."  (from Tirmidhi)

Al Hakim records on the authority of ibn Abbas that Muhammad advanced, carrying upon his back Hassan ibn Ali, and a man met him and said, 'an excellent steed thou ridest, lad!'.  Muhammad replied, 'and he is an excellent rider.'

Ali ibn Husam Adin (commonly known as al-Mutaki al-Hindi) records that ibn Abbas narrated that Muhammad said the following about his deceased aunt Fatima, the mother of Ali: "I (Muhammad) put on her my shirt that she may wear the clothes of heaven, and I lay in her grave that I may lessen the pressure of the grave. She was the best of Allah’s creatures to me after Abu Talib".

Legacy 
As ʿAbd-Allah's knowledge grew, he grew in stature. Masruq ibn al Ajda said of him:
Ibn Abbas is highly respected by both Shia and Sunnis. The 1924 Cairo edition Quran adopted the chronological order of chapters promulgated by Ibn Abbās, which subsequently became widely accepted following 1924.

His descendants

Views
Ibn Abbas viewed that Tafsir can be divided in four categories:
 The category the Arabs knew because of its language
 Those of ignorance, of which no one will be excused
 Those the scholars know
 Those no one knows except Allah

Sunni view

Sunni view him as the most knowledgeable of the Companions in tafsir.  A book entitled Tanwir al-Miqbas min Tafsir Ibn Abbas is tafsir, all explanations of which may go back to Ibn Abbas. Of all narrations transmitted by Ibn Abbas, 1660 were considered authentic by the authors of the two Sahihs.

Regarding Ibn Abbas giving verdicts in favor of Nikah Mut'ah, most Sunnis view that Ali corrected him on the matter, while other view that "Ibn Abbas position on the permissibility of Mut'ah until his last day is proven" per the Hadith of Ibn al-Zubayr and Mut'ah.

Sunnis describe thus:

See also
List of Islamic scholars
Sunni view of the Sahaba
List of Sahabah
Banu Hashim

References

External links
Narrations from Ibn Abbas in Tasfir ibn Kathir
Hadith by Abdullah Ibn Abbas Collected By Bukhari

Sahabah hadith narrators
Family of Muhammad
Quranic exegesis scholars
Islam articles needing attention
7th-century Muslim scholars of Islam
619 births
687 deaths
Banu Abbas
Rashidun governors of Basra